Cha is the seventh consonant of Indic abugidas. In modern Indic scripts, cha is derived from the early "Ashoka" Brahmi letter , which is probably derived from the Aramaic letter  ("Q") after having gone through the Gupta letter .

Āryabhaṭa numeration

Aryabhata used Devanagari letters for numbers, very similar to the Greek numerals, even after the invention of Indian numerals.
The values of the different forms of छ are: 
छ  = 7 (७)
छि  = 700 (७००)
छु  = 70,000 (७० ०००)
छृ  = 7,000,000 (७० ०० ०००)
छॢ  = 7 (७०८)
छे  = 7 (७०१०)
छै  = 7 (७०१२)
छो  = 7 (७०१४)
छौ  = 7 (७०१६)

Historic Cha
There are three different general early historic scripts - Brahmi and its variants, Kharoṣṭhī, and Tocharian, the so-called slanting Brahmi. Cha as found in standard Brahmi,  was a simple geometric shape, with variations toward more flowing forms by the Gupta . The Tocharian Cha  did not have an alternate Fremdzeichen form. The third form of cha, in Kharoshthi was probably derived from Aramaic separately from the Brahmi letter.

Brahmi Cha
The Brahmi letter , Cha, is probably derived from the altered Aramaic Tsade , and is thus related to the Greek San (letter). Several identifiable styles of writing the Brahmi Cha can be found, most associated with a specific set of inscriptions from an artifact or diverse records from an historic period. As the earliest and most geometric style of Brahmi, the letters found on the Edicts of Ashoka and other records from around that time are normally the reference form for Brahmi letters, with vowel marks not attested until later forms of Brahmi back-formed to match the geometric writing style.

Tocharian Cha
The Tocharian letter  is derived from the Brahmi , but does not have an alternate Fremdzeichen form.

Kharoṣṭhī Cha
The Kharoṣṭhī letter  is generally accepted as being derived from the altered Aramaic Tsade , and is thus related to the Greek San (letter), in addition to the Brahmi Cha.

Devanagari script

Cha (छ) is the seventh consonant of the Devanagari abugida. It ultimately arose from the Brahmi letter , after having gone through the Gupta letter . Letters that derive from it are the Gujarati letter છ and the Modi letter 𑘔.

Devanagari-using Languages
Like all Indic scripts, Devanagari uses vowel marks attached to the base consonant to override the inherent /ə/ vowel:

Conjuncts with छ

Devanagari exhibits conjunct ligatures, as is common in Indic scripts. In modern Devanagari texts, most conjuncts are formed by reducing the letter shape to fit tightly to the following letter, usually by dropping a character's vertical stem, sometimes referred to as a "half form". Some conjunct clusters are always represented by a true ligature, instead of a shape that can be broken into constituent independent letters. Vertically stacked conjuncts are ubiquitous in older texts, while only a few are still used routinely in modern Devanagari texts. The use of ligatures and vertical conjuncts may vary across languages using the Devanagari script, with Marathi in particular preferring the use of half forms where texts in other languages would show ligatures and vertical stacks.

Ligature conjuncts of छ
True ligatures are quite rare in Indic scripts. The most common ligated conjuncts in Devanagari are in the form of a slight mutation to fit in context or as a consistent variant form appended to the adjacent characters. Those variants include Na and the Repha and Rakar forms of Ra. Nepali and Marathi texts use the "eyelash" Ra half form  for an initial "R" instead of repha.
 Repha र্ (r) + छ (cʰa) gives the ligature rcʰa: 

 Eyelash र্ (r) + छ (cʰa) gives the ligature rcʰa:

 छ্ (cʰ) + rakar र (ra) gives the ligature cʰra:

Stacked conjuncts of छ
Vertically stacked ligatures are the most common conjunct forms found in Devanagari text. Although the constituent characters may need to be stretched and moved slightly in order to stack neatly, stacked conjuncts can be broken down into recognizable base letters, or a letter and an otherwise standard ligature.
 ब্ (b) + छ (cʰa) gives the ligature bcʰa:

 छ্ (cʰ) + ब (ba) gives the ligature cʰba:

 छ্ (cʰ) + भ (bʰa) gives the ligature cʰbʰa:

 छ্ (cʰ) + च (ca) gives the ligature cʰca:

 छ্ (cʰ) + छ (cʰa) gives the ligature cʰcʰa:

 छ্ (cʰ) + द (da) gives the ligature cʰda:

 छ্ (cʰ) + ड (ḍa) gives the ligature cʰḍa:

 छ্ (cʰ) + ढ (ḍʱa) gives the ligature cʰḍʱa:

 छ্ (cʰ) + ध (dʱa) gives the ligature cʰdʱa:

 छ্ (cʰ) + ग (ga) gives the ligature cʰga:

 छ্ (cʰ) + घ (ɡʱa) gives the ligature cʰɡʱa:

 छ্ (cʰ) + ह (ha) gives the ligature cʰha:

 छ্ (cʰ) + ज (ja) gives the ligature cʰja:

 छ্ (cʰ) + झ (jʰa) gives the ligature cʰjʰa:

 छ্ (cʰ) + ज্ (j) + ञ (ña) gives the ligature cʰjña:

 छ্ (cʰ) + क (ka) gives the ligature cʰka:

 छ্ (cʰ) + ख (kʰa) gives the ligature cʰkʰa:

 छ্ (cʰ) + क্ (k) + ष (ṣa) gives the ligature cʰkṣa:

 छ্ (cʰ) + ल (la) gives the ligature cʰla:

 छ্ (cʰ) + ळ (ḷa) gives the ligature cʰḷa:

 छ্ (cʰ) + म (ma) gives the ligature cʰma:

 छ্ (cʰ) + न (na) gives the ligature cʰna:

 छ্ (cʰ) + ङ (ŋa) gives the ligature cʰŋa:

 छ্ (cʰ) + ण (ṇa) gives the ligature cʰṇa:

 छ্ (cʰ) + ञ (ña) gives the ligature cʰña:

 छ্ (cʰ) + प (pa) gives the ligature cʰpa:

 छ্ (cʰ) + फ (pʰa) gives the ligature cʰpʰa:

 छ্ (cʰ) + स (sa) gives the ligature cʰsa:

 छ্ (cʰ) + श (ʃa) gives the ligature cʰʃa:

 छ্ (cʰ) + ष (ṣa) gives the ligature cʰṣa:

 छ্ (cʰ) + त (ta) gives the ligature cʰta:

 छ্ (cʰ) + थ (tʰa) gives the ligature cʰtʰa:

 छ্ (cʰ) + ट (ṭa) gives the ligature cʰṭa:

 छ্ (cʰ) + ठ (ṭʰa) gives the ligature cʰṭʰa:

 छ্ (cʰ) + व (va) gives the ligature cʰva:

 छ্ (cʰ) + य (ya) gives the ligature cʰya:

 द্ (d) + छ (cʰa) gives the ligature dcʰa:

 ड্ (ḍ) + छ (cʰa) gives the ligature ḍcʰa:

 ढ্ (ḍʱ) + छ (cʰa) gives the ligature ḍʱcʰa:

 ख্ (kʰ) + छ (cʰa) gives the ligature kʰcʰa:

 ङ্ (ŋ) + छ (cʰa) gives the ligature ŋcʰa:

 ट্ (ṭ) + छ (cʰa) gives the ligature ṭcʰa:

 ठ্ (ṭʰ) + छ (cʰa) gives the ligature ṭʰcʰa:

 व্ (v) + छ (cʰa) gives the ligature vcʰa:

Bengali script
The Bengali script ছ is derived from the Siddhaṃ , and is marked by a similar horizontal head line, but less geometric shape, than its Devanagari counterpart, छ. The inherent vowel of Bengali consonant letters is /ɔ/, so the bare letter ছ will sometimes be transliterated as "cho" instead of "cha". Adding okar, the "o" vowel mark, gives a reading of /cʰo/.
Like all Indic consonants, ছ can be modified by marks to indicate another (or no) vowel than its inherent "a".

ছ in Bengali-using languages
ছ is used as a basic consonant character in all of the major Bengali script orthographies, including Bengali and Assamese.

Conjuncts with ছ
Bengali ছ exhibits conjunct ligatures, as is common in Indic scripts. Unlike most Bengali letters, conjuncts with ছ do not tend towards stacked ligatures.
 চ্ (c) + ছ (cʰa) gives the ligature ccʰa:

 চ্ (c) + ছ্ (cʰ) + র (ra) gives the ligature ccʰra, with the ra phala suffix:

 চ্ (c) + ছ্ (cʰ) + ব (va) gives the ligature ccʰva, with the va phala suffix:

 ঞ (ñ) + ছ (cʰa) gives the ligature ñcʰa:

 র্ (r) + ছ (cʰa) gives the ligature rcʰa, with the repha prefix:

 শ্ (ʃ) + ছ (cʰa) gives the ligature ʃcʰa:

Gujarati Cha

Cha (છ) is the seventh consonant of the Gujarati abugida. It is derived from the 16th century Devanagari Cha  with the top bar (shiro rekha) removed, and ultimately from the Brahmi letter .

Gujarati-using Languages
The Gujarati script is used to write the Gujarati and Kutchi languages. Like all Indic scripts, Gujarati uses vowel marks attached to the base consonant to override the inherent /ə/ vowel:

Conjuncts with છ
Gujarati છ exhibits conjunct ligatures, much like its parent Devanagari Script. While most Gujarati conjuncts can only be formed by reducing the letter shape to create a "half form" that fits tightly to following letter, Cha does not have a half form. A few conjunct clusters can be represented by a true ligature, instead of a shape that can be broken into constituent independent letters, and vertically stacked conjuncts can also be found in Gujarati, although much less commonly than in Devanagari. Lacking a half form, Cha will normally use an explicit virama when forming conjuncts without a true ligature.
True ligatures are quite rare in Indic scripts. The most common ligated conjuncts in Gujarati are in the form of a slight mutation to fit in context or as a consistent variant form appended to the adjacent characters. Those variants include Na and the Repha and Rakar forms of Ra.
 ર્ (r) + છ (cʰa) gives the ligature RCha:

 છ્ (cʰ) + ર (ra) gives the ligature ChRa:

Gurmukhi script 
Chhachhaa  (ਛ) is the twelfth letter of the Gurmukhi alphabet. Its name is [t͡ʃʰət͡ʃʰːɑ] and is pronounced as /t͡ʃʰ/ when used in words. It is derived from the Laṇḍā letter cha, and ultimately from the Brahmi cha. Gurmukhi chachaa does not have a special pairin or addha (reduced) form for making conjuncts, and in modern Punjabi texts do not take a half form or halant to indicate the bare consonant /t͡ʃʰ/, although Gurmukhi Sanskrit texts may use an explicit halant.

Telugu Cha

Cha (ఛ) is a consonant of the Telugu abugida. It ultimately arose from the Brahmi letter . It is closely related to the Kannada letter ಛ. Most Telugu consonants contain a v-shaped headstroke that is related to the horizontal headline found in other Indic scripts, although headstrokes do not connect adjacent letters in Telugu. The headstroke is normally lost when adding vowel matras.
Telugu conjuncts are created by reducing trailing letters to a subjoined form that appears below the initial consonant of the conjunct. Many subjoined forms are created by dropping their headline, with many extending the end of the stroke of the main letter body to form an extended tail reaching up to the right of the preceding consonant. This subjoining of trailing letters to create conjuncts is in contrast to the leading half forms of Devanagari and Bengali letters. Ligature conjuncts are not a feature in Telugu, with the only non-standard construction being an alternate subjoined form of Ṣa (borrowed from Kannada) in the KṢa conjunct.

Malayalam Cha

Cha (ഛ) is a consonant of the Malayalam abugida. It ultimately arose from the Brahmi letter , via the Grantha letter  Cha. Like in other Indic scripts, Malayalam consonants have the inherent vowel "a", and take one of several modifying vowel signs to represent syllables with another vowel or no vowel at all.

Conjuncts of ഛ
As is common in Indic scripts, Malayalam joins letters together to form conjunct consonant clusters. There are several ways in which conjuncts are formed in Malayalam texts: using a post-base form of a trailing consonant placed under the initial consonant of a conjunct, a combined ligature of two or more consonants joined together, a conjoining form that appears as a combining mark on the rest of the conjunct, the use of an explicit candrakkala mark to suppress the inherent "a" vowel, or a special consonant form called a "chillu" letter, representing a bare consonant without the inherent "a" vowel. Cha does not form ligatures or other combining forms, and Cha conjuncts can only be formed with post-base forms of other letter or an explicit candrakkala. Texts written with the modern reformed Malayalam orthography, put̪iya lipi, may favor more regular conjunct forms than older texts in paḻaya lipi, due to changes undertaken in the 1970s by the Government of Kerala.

Thai script 
Cho ching (ฉ) is the ninth letter of the Thai script. It falls under the high class of Thai consonants. In IPA, cho ching is pronounced as [tɕʰ] at the beginning of a syllable and may not be used to close a syllable. The eighth letter of the alphabet, cho chan (จ), is also named cho but represents a different initial consonant sound ([tɕ]) and falls under the middle class of Thai consonants. The tenth and twelfth letters of the alphabet, cho chang (ช) and cho choe (ฌ), are also named cho, however, they all fall under the low class of Thai consonants. Unlike many Indic scripts, Thai consonants do not form conjunct ligatures, and use the pinthu—an explicit virama with a dot shape—to indicate bare consonants. In the acrophony of the Thai script, ching (ฉิ่ง) means ‘cymbals (ching)’. Cho ching corresponds to the Sanskrit character ‘छ’.

Odia Cha

Cha (ଛ) is a consonant of the Odia abugida. It ultimately arose from the Brahmi letter , via the Siddhaṃ letter  Cha. Like in other Indic scripts, Odia consonants have the inherent vowel "a", and take one of several modifying vowel signs to represent syllables with another vowel or no vowel at all.

Conjuncts of ଛ 
As is common in Indic scripts, Odia joins letters together to form conjunct consonant clusters. The most common conjunct formation is achieved by using a small subjoined form of trailing consonants. Most consonants' subjoined forms are identical to the full form, just reduced in size, although a few drop the curved headline or have a subjoined form not directly related to the full form of the consonant. The second type of conjunct formation is through pure ligatures, where the constituent consonants are written together in a single graphic form. This ligature may be recognizable as being a combination of two characters or it can have a conjunct ligature unrelated to its constituent characters. The "infinity" shaped subjoined form of Cha used in a few conjuncts is identical to the normal subjoined form of Tha and should not be confused with Tha.
 ଚ୍ (c) +  ଛ (cʰa) gives the ligature ccʰa:

 ଞ୍ (ñ) +  ଛ (cʰa) gives the ligature ñcʰa:

 ଶ୍ (ʃ) +  ଛ (cʰa) gives the ligature ʃcʰa:

Comparison of Cha
The various Indic scripts are generally related to each other through adaptation and borrowing, and as such the glyphs for cognate letters, including Cha, are related as well.

Character encodings of Cha
Most Indic scripts are encoded in the Unicode Standard, and as such the letter Cha in those scripts can be represented in plain text with unique codepoint. Cha from several modern-use scripts can also be found in legacy encodings, such as ISCII.

See also
 Qoph

References

 Kurt Elfering: Die Mathematik des Aryabhata I. Text, Übersetzung aus dem Sanskrit und Kommentar. Wilhelm Fink Verlag, München, 1975, 
 Georges Ifrah: The Universal History of Numbers. From Prehistory to the Invention of the Computer. John Wiley & Sons, New York, 2000, .
 B. L. van der Waerden: Erwachende Wissenschaft. Ägyptische, babylonische und griechische Mathematik. Birkhäuser-Verlag, Basel Stuttgart, 1966, 
 
 
 Conjuncts are identified by IAST transliteration, except aspirated consonants are indicated with a superscript "h" to distinguish from an unaspirated cononant + Ha, and the use of the IPA "ŋ" and "ʃ" instead of the less dinstinctive "ṅ" and "ś".

Indic letters